Caergybi is an electoral ward in Holyhead, Anglesey, Wales. It includes the northern half of the community including the town centre and port. Caergybi elects three county councillors to the Isle of Anglesey County Council. Caergybi includes the community wards of Town, London Road, Morawelon, Porthafelin and Parc a'r Mynydd, which elect representatives to Holyhead Town Council.

According to the 2011 UK Census the combined total population of Holyhead Town, London Road, Morawelon, Porthafelin and Parc a'r mynydd was 7,620.

Caergybi was created following the Isle of Anglesey electoral boundary changes in 2012. Prior to this, Holyhead Town, London Road, Morawelon, Porthafelin and Parc a'r mynydd were each county wards and elected their own county councillor.

Election results

See also
 Ynys Gybi (electoral ward)

References

Holyhead
Wards of Anglesey